Old Uyghur was a Turkic language which was spoken in Qocho from the 9th–14th centuries and in Gansu.

History

The Old Uyghur language evolved from Old Turkic after the Uyghur Khaganate broke up and remnants of it migrated to Turfan, Qomul (later Hami) and Gansu in the 9th century. The Uyghurs in Turfan and Qomul founded Qocho and adopted Manichaeism and Buddhism as their religions, while those in Gansu first founded the Ganzhou Uyghur Kingdom and became subjects of the Western Xia; and their descendants are the Yugur.

The Kingdom of Qocho survived as a client state of the Mongol Empire but was conquered by the Muslim Chagatai Khanate which conquered Turfan and Qomul and Islamisized the region. The Old Uyghur language then became extinct in Turfan and Qomul.

The modern Uyghur language is not descended from Old Uyghur; rather, it is a descendant of the Karluk languages spoken by the Kara-Khanid Khanate, in particular the Xākānī language described by Mahmud al-Kashgari while Western Yugur is considered to be the true descendant of Old Uyghur and is also called "Neo-Uygur" according to Gerard Clauson.

According to Frederik Coene and Martina Roos, Modern Uyghur and Western Yugur belong to entirely different branches of the Turkic language family, respectively southeastern (Karluk) and northeastern (Siberian Turkic).

Features
Old Uyghur had an anticipating counting system and a copula dro, which is passed on to Western Yugur.

Literature

Much of Old Uyghur literature is religious texts regarding Manichaeism and Buddhism, with examples found among the Dunhuang manuscripts. Multilingual inscriptions including Old Uyghur can be found at the Cloud Platform at Juyong Pass and the Stele of Sulaiman.

Script 

Qocho, the Uyghur kingdom created in 843, originally used the "runic" Old Turkic alphabet with a "anïγ" dialect. The Old Uyghur alphabet was adopted from local inhabitants, along with a "ayïγ" dialect, when they migrated into Turfan after 840.

References

Citations

Sources 

 
 Chén Zōngzhèn & Léi Xuǎnchūn. 1985. Xībù Yùgùyǔ Jiānzhì [Concise grammar of Western Yugur]. Peking.

Further reading
Tisastvustik; ein in türkischer Sprache bearbeitetes buddhistisches Sutra. I. Transcription und Übersetzung von W. Radloff. II. Bemerkungen zu den Brahmiglossen des Tisastvustik-Manuscripts (Mus. A. Kr. VII) von Baron A. von Stäel-Holstein (1910)

Agglutinative languages
Uyghurs
Turkic languages
Languages of China
Extinct languages of Asia